Svetozar Cvetković (born 20 June 1958) is a Serbian actor. He appeared in more than eighty films since 1980 and played the lead role in Do Not Forget Me Istanbul together with Mira Furlan.

Selected filmography

References

External links 

 

1958 births
Living people
Male actors from Belgrade
Serbian male film actors
Miloš Žutić Award winners
Dr. Branivoj Đorđević Award winners